Burnham-on-Sea is a seaside town in Somerset, England, at the mouth of the River Parrett, upon Bridgwater Bay. Burnham was a small fishing village until the late 18th century when it began to grow because of its popularity as a seaside resort.

Burnham-on-Sea forms part of the parish of Burnham-on-Sea and Highbridge and shares a town council with its neighbouring small market town of Highbridge. According to the 2011 census the population of the parish (including Highbridge) was 19,576, of which the most populous wards 'Burnham Central' and 'Burnham North'; totalled 13,601.

Burnham-on-Sea is famous for its low lighthouse. The lighthouse was built in 1832 and is a Grade-II listed building with a red and white striped facade.

The position of the town on the edge of the Somerset Levels  and moors where they meet the Bristol Channel, has resulted in a history dominated by land reclamation and sea defences since Roman times. Burnham was seriously affected by the Bristol Channel floods of 1607, with the present curved concrete wall being completed in 1988. There have been many shipwrecks on the Gore Sands, which lie just offshore and can be exposed at low tides. Lighthouses are hence prominent landmarks in the town, with the original lighthouse known as the Round Tower built to replace the light on the top of the 14th-century tower of St Andrews Church. The  pillar or High Lighthouse and the low wooden pile lighthouse or Lighthouse on legs on the beach were built to replace it. The town's first lifeboat was provided in 1836 by the Corporation of Bridgwater.

History 
The name Burnham is derived from Burnhamm, as it was called in the will of King Alfred, made up from the Old English words Burna meaning stream and Hamm for enclosure. On-Sea was added later as there are several other towns of the same name in England.

The history of Burnham-on-Sea is the history of the reclamation of the Somerset Levels from the River Severn and the Bristol Channel. The Romans were the first peoples to try to reclaim the Somerset levels, and it was their people who were probably the first settlers in the high sand dunes behind the River Parrett. This could have been in part to maintain navigational systems, to aid ships entering the River Parrett and what is now Highbridge. When the Romans left, the system of drainage they installed was not maintained, and the areas reverted to become a tidal salt flat during the Anglo Saxon period.

It is likely that at the time of the Norman Domesday book, settlements existed at Burnham and Huntspill, their common boundary running along what is now the Westhill Rhyne. The church at Burnham and its lands were given to Gloucester Abbey in the 12th century, later transferred to Wells Cathedral along with up to 50 houses surrounding the church. Burnham was part of the hundred of Bempstone.

One of the earliest recorded incidents to affect the town was the Bristol Channel floods of 1607, since when various flood defences have been installed. In 1911 a concrete wall was built. After the Second World War, further additions to the defences against the sea were added by bringing part of the remains of a Mulberry harbour used for the Normandy Landings, and burying them in the sand. Today the town is defended from flooding by a large curved concrete wall, completed in 1988 following serious flooding in 1981. The wall runs along the Esplanade, and serves as the canvas for a wide variety of graffiti and street art.

In 1940 she was transferred to the British under the agreement with the United Kingdom exchanging American destroyers for bases in the Atlantic. She transferred to the Royal Navy where she served as HMS Burnham (H82) during the Second World War. In 1942, Burnham was formally adopted by Burnham-on-Sea. In 1944, she was used on aircraft training duties in the Western Approaches Command, which allowed a contingent from the ship to visit the town and march through its streets. Burnham was reduced to reserve at Milford Haven, Wales, in November 1944. She was ultimately scrapped at Pembroke, in December 1948.

Geography 
Burnham-on-Sea is notable for its beach and mudflats, the danger they pose to individuals and shipping, and the efforts to which locals have gone in defending their town and preventing loss of life. Burnham is close to the estuary of the River Parrett where it flows into the Bristol Channel, which has the second highest tidal range in the world. At , it is second only to the Bay of Fundy in Eastern Canada.
Bridgwater Bay consists of large areas of mud flats, saltmarsh, sandflats and shingle ridges, some of which are vegetated. It has been designated as a Site of Special Scientific Interest since 1989, and is designated as a wetland of international importance under the Ramsar Convention.

The park was created from excavated clay pits, which were flooded, and the lakes are now home to many types of wildlife and leisure activities.

The landscape of Hinkley Point is dominated by two nuclear power stations: Hinkley Point A – Magnox (now closed) and Hinkley Point B – AGR. A third, twin-unit European Pressurized Reactor (EPR) reactor is planned, and will become Hinkley Point C.

Climate 
Along with the rest of South West England, Burnham has a temperate climate which is generally wetter and milder than the rest of the country. Seasonal temperature variation is less extreme than most of the United Kingdom because of the adjacent sea temperatures. In the summer the Azores high pressure affects the south-west of England, however convective cloud sometimes forms inland, reducing the number of hours of sunshine. Annual sunshine rates are slightly less than the regional average of 1,600 hours. Most of the rainfall in the south-west is caused by Atlantic depressions or by convection. Most of the rainfall in autumn and winter is caused by the Atlantic depressions, which is when they are most active. In summer, a large proportion of the rainfall is caused by sun heating the ground leading to convection and to showers and thunderstorms. About 8–15 days of snowfall is typical. November to March have the highest mean wind speeds, and June to August have the lightest winds. The predominant wind direction is from the south-west.

Sea defences 
Burnham was seriously affected by the Bristol Channel floods of 1607, and various flood defences have been installed since then. In 1911, a concrete sea wall was built, and after World War II further additions to the defences were made using the remains of a Mulberry harbour.

On 13 December 1981, a large storm hit the North Somerset coast. Over topping of the sea defences along a  stretch of the Somerset coast at 22 locations from Clevedon to Porlock began after 19:30, and continued until about 21:30 when the wind speed had reached  from the west. Although there was no loss of life, the resultant flooding covered  of land, affecting 1,072 houses and commercial properties, with £150,000 worth of livestock killed and £50,000 of feed and grain destroyed. Wessex Water Authority estimated the total cost of the damage caused at £6M. This resulted in a three-year programme of sea defence assessment, repair and improvement.

Burnham, being the largest occupied town within the 1981 surge affected area, also bore the brunt of the resultant damage. 400 properties were affected, with pavements, stone and concrete from the sea wall ripped up and the Esplande destroyed; total damage within the parish was estimated at £1.5M. Although emergency repairs were undertaken, Wessex Water Authority began planning new sea defences for the town. Construction work started in 1983 on a £7M scheme, creating what was then Britain’s biggest wave return wall. Taking five years to complete and coming into operation in 1988, beach access is now via a series of raised steps for visitors, with three vehicle access points which can be closed during storms using sealed gates.

Lifeboats and BARB 

There have been many shipwrecks on the Gore Sands. The first lifeboat was sent to Burnham by the Bridgwater Corporation in 1836, and a replacement boat in 1847.

The first Royal National Lifeboat was funded by the town of Cheltenham, and arrived in 1866. The lifeboat was removed in 1930 because of the difficulty in getting a full crew, and because the launching arrangements were not suitable for a powered boat. The current Burnham-on-Sea Lifeboat Station is the base for Royal National Lifeboat Institution (RNLI) search and rescue operations. The present station was opened in 2003. It operates two inshore lifeboats (ILBs), a B Class rigid-hulled boat and an inflatable D Class.

The Burnham-on-Sea Area Rescue Boat now known as BARB Search & Rescue was set up in 1992 to fund and operate rescue craft in the Bridgwater Bay area. BARB's boat house on the sea front was built in 1994 by the Challenge Anneka TV show. In 2002, Lelaina Hall, a five-year-old girl from Worcester, died on the mud flats before help could reach her. The outcry over her death prompted a Western Daily Press campaign to fund an inshore hovercraft.
BARB currently operates the Spirit of Lelaina alongside her sister hovercraft the Light of Elizabeth, which is named after Lelaina's sister.

Governance 
The civil parish of Burnham-on-Sea and Highbridge has responsibility for local issues, including setting an annual precept (local rate) to cover the council's operating costs and producing annual accounts for public scrutiny. The parish council evaluates local planning applications and works with the local police, district council officers, and neighbourhood watch groups on matters of crime, security, and traffic. The parish council's role also includes initiating projects for the maintenance and repair of parish facilities, as well as consulting with the district council on the maintenance, repair, and improvement of highways, drainage, footpaths, public transport, and street cleaning. In recent years the parish council has become a significant grant funder of local organisations and events. There is currently a debate underway about the correct disbursement and monitoring of these grants, following allegations of impropriety regarding some councillors.

Burnham was a large ancient parish, and until the late 19th century included the then hamlet of Highbridge and rural areas around Edithmead.  In 1894 Highbridge became a separate civil parish, itself divided in 1896 between the new civil parishes of North Highbridge (within Highbridge Urban District) and Burnham Without.  Burnham itself became Burnham Urban District, renamed Burnham-on-Sea Urban District in 1917. In 1933 it annexed Highbridge Urban District. This combined urban district became a civil parish in 1974 under the Local Government Act 1972. The town now falls within the non-metropolitan district of Sedgemoor, which was formed under the same legislation. Sedgemoor is responsible for local planning and building control, local roads, council housing, environmental health, markets and fairs, refuse collection and recycling, cemeteries and crematoria, leisure services, parks, and tourism.

Somerset County Council is responsible for running the largest and most expensive local services such as education, social services, libraries, main roads, public transport, policing and fire services, trading standards, waste disposal and strategic planning.

There are two electoral wards in the town itself (Central and North) making the total population at the 2011 census mentioned above of 13,601.

It falls within the Wells county constituency which elects one Member of Parliament (MP) to the House of Commons of the Parliament of the United Kingdom, by the first past the post voting system. Prior to Brexit in 2020, it was within the South West England constituency of the European Parliament.

Landmarks

Lighthouses 
Because of its position near the mouth of the River Parrett, and the constantly shifting sands of the Bristol Channel, there has always been a significant risk to shipping in the area. As a result, several lighthouses, have been built.

The original lighthouse, known as the Round Tower, was built after the local vicar, either John Goulden in 1764 or Walter Harris in 1799, raised a subscription amongst the local population to replace the light on the top of St Andrews Church tower. The four-storey Round Tower was built next to the church. It was taken over and improved by Trinity House in 1815, and operated until 1832, following which the top two storeys were removed.
The  pillar or High Lighthouse was designed and built by Joseph Nelson for Trinity House in 1830, and equipped with a paraffin lamp. It was automated in 1920. In 1992, it was sold to a member of the Rothschild family, who owned it until 1996, when it was bought at auction by Patrick O'Hagan. Conversion for residential use included the removal of the 6th floor and the construction of stairs where there had previously only been ladders. A Grade II listed building, it is now available for holiday lets.

The low wooden pile lighthouse or "Lighthouse on legs", or "Nine Pins", was built two years later, also by Joseph Nelson, to complement the High Lighthouse. It stands on nine wooden piers, some with plate metal reinforcement. The structure is whitewashed with a vertical red stripe on the sea side. The lights were inactive between 1969 and 1993, but were recommissioned when the High Lighthouse lights were permanently deactivated.

Pier 

A  stone pier was erected in 1858 by the Somerset Central Railway. Soon afterwards, in 1860, a steamer service to Wales was inaugurated, but it was never a commercial success, and ended in 1888. The pier retains its railway lines under a surface coating of concrete.

The concrete pier, built in 1911–1914, is claimed to be the shortest pier in Britain. However it is merely a beach pavilion, and is thus discounted by many pier experts. In 2008, it was rated amongst the top five piers in Britain by the Daily Express.

The Royal Clarence Hotel 
The hotel was built in 1796 and incorporated the first bar in Burnham-on-Sea.

Listed buildings 
The Esplanade along the sea front contains several listed buildings from the early 19th century, including number 44, which is also known as Steart House, and numbers 46 and 47.

On Berrow Road, near the High Lighthouse, numbers 4, 6 and 8 were part of a terrace built between 1838 and 1841. Number 31 was previously a lodge. On the corner of Berrow Road and Sea View is a drinking fountain from 1897 with a single dressed stone pier and moulded plinth, topped by a cast iron urn. Each side has the lions head design with those on the north and south sides giving water into a Purbeck Marble bowl.

Education 
Primary schools in the town providing education for children up to the age of 11 include: Berrow Church of England Primary School, Burnham-on-Sea Community Infants School, St Andrew's Church of England Junior School, St Joseph's Catholic Primary School and Nursery.

The nearest secondary school is The King Alfred School, a coeducational comprehensive school located in Highbridge. The school is a specialist Sports College. In 2007, the school celebrated its 50th anniversary. The facilities of the dual-use King Alfred Sports Centre, which is next to the school site, are shared between the school and town.

Religious sites 

The parish church, St. Andrew's, is a Grade I listed building dating from the 14th century. During the 18th century, a light was placed on the tower to guide fishing boats into the harbour. The church contains a number of marble carvings designed by Sir Christopher Wren for the private chapel in the Palace of Westminster.

There are also places of worship for Baptists, Methodists, Roman Catholics and Jehovah's Witnesses in the town.

Transport 
Burnham-on-Sea railway station was the terminus of the Burnham branch of the Somerset and Dorset Joint Railway, but the tracks continued onto the jetty, where ferry services to South Wales could be boarded. The station opened in 1858 as Burnham, and was renamed Burnham-on-Sea in 1920. It closed to scheduled passenger traffic in 1951 and stopped being used for excursions in 1962. It finally closed to goods traffic in 1963.

The former Great Western Railway station is now known as Highbridge and Burnham. The station was opened as "Highbridge" on 14 June 1841, when the Bristol and Exeter Railway opened its broad gauge line as far as Bridgwater. A road crossed the line at the north end of the platforms, and a goods shed was provided beyond this on the west side of the line. The Bristol and Exeter Railway amalgamated with the Great Western Railway on 1 January 1876.

There are two main bus routes serving Burnham-on-Sea.  These are service 21A from Taunton operated by The Buses of Somerset and service 20 from Weston-super-Mare operated by First West of England.

Culture and sport 
The town is part of the West Country Carnival circuit.

Burnham and Berrow Golf Course lies at the North of the town and is a 36-hole championship.

Burnham-on-Sea is a noted venue for kitesurfing, as well as other water sports, and has its own sailing club.

Land side many activities cater for either the dominant resident elderly population or the seasonal tourists, including bowls, and there is also a swimming pool and sports academy.

The Burnham-on-Sea rugby union club was formed in 1887. It was wound up after World War 2 and subsequently reformed. After winning the Tribute Somerset Premier in the 2008–09 they were promoted to the Western Counties North, a level seven rugby union league for clubs based in the south-west of England.

The Burnham-on-Sea cricket club was established in 1861 and has played continuously since then. They currently play in the Somerset Cricket League Premier Div. The ground is in Stoddens Road and boasts fine facilities. The best-known player in the club's history is Sammy Woods, who played Test cricket for England and Australia during the 1890s. The club has also provided a number of players for Somerset in the County Championship competition.

In 2016 the town held the Burnham Spray Jam which decorated the streets with artwork from John D'Oh, Andrew Burns Colwill, SPZERO, Irony, Cheba, Diff, Angus, The Agent, Miss Wah, 23 Magpies, Korp and many others. This year the Spray Jam has been incorporated into BOSfest which will also include music, poetry and street entertainment.

The town is home to multi-award winning eat:Festivals, who organise three food and drink festivals in this town and in 9 other Somerset towns. The festivals have very high sustainability standards and are always free to attend. Featuring workshops, demos, master classes alongside over 100 local producers from within 25 miles and lots of free entertainment.

Notable residents 
Thomas Alan Stephenson, a marine biologist, was born in the town in 1898, and it was also the birthplace of John Pople, a theoretical chemist, in 1925. The novelist Isobel English was sent to La Retraite, a Burnham-on-Sea convent school, in 1920. Arthur Gilbert, confirmed as the world's oldest triathlete in 2011, lives and competes in the town. George Shelley of X Factor boy band Union J lived in Burnham-on-Sea and attended The King Alfred School, Highbridge, where he studied his GCSEs. Also resident is world champion Scottish Darts player Gary Anderson.

Twin towns 
Burnham-on-Sea is twinned with:
 Cassis, France

References

External links 

 Burnham & Highbridge Town council Website

 
Towns in Sedgemoor
Seaside resorts in England
Somerset Levels
Populated coastal places in Somerset
Beaches of Somerset